Sylvester Hotchkiss, also known as S. C. Hotchkiss, was a Chicago-based architect who also worked in Arkansas.

Works by Hotchkiss include:
Lambert House (Monticello, Arkansas), a Colonial Revival house at 204 W. Jackson Street in Monticello, built in 1905 and listed on the National Register of Historic Places in 1983
Hotchkiss House (Monticello, Arkansas), at 577 N. Boyd St., Monticello, Arkansas, also NRHP-listed
 Allen House (Monticello, Arkansas), designed and built by Hotchkiss, at 705 North Main, Monticello

References

American architects
Year of death missing
Year of birth missing